Agaleus is an extinct genus of stem Galeomorph shark from the Early Jurassic Epoch. The genus Agaleus is monotypic,  consisting solely of the species Agaleus dorsetensis. This species is currently only known from isolated teeth.

Taxonomy
Some authorities have placed this species as a basal member of the order Orectolobiformes, but subsequent researchers have found it to be a stem-Galeomorph just outside the crown group of Orectolobiformes.

Distribution 
It is known from the Sinemurian of Lyme Regis, England and the Pliensbachian-aged Hasle Formation of Denmark. Other places which have produced this species include Northern Ireland, France, Belgium, and Sweden. Possible later occurrences of this genus in north-western Europe have been documented but not yet formally attributed to the genus.

References

Sharks
Prehistoric shark genera